Prasophyllum sylvestre, commonly known as the forest leek orchid, is a species of orchid endemic to south-eastern Australia. It has a single tubular, bright green leaf and up to thirty faintly scented, pale green, pink and reddish-brown flowers. It is similar to P. fuscum and P. affine but differs from them, including in the habitat in which they grow.

Description
As with others in the genus, the flowers are inverted so that the labellum is above the column rather than below it. Flowering occurs from late October to early December and is usually triggered by fire or other light disturbance.

Taxonomy and naming
Prasophyllum sylvestre was first formally described in 1991 by Robert Bates and David Jones from a specimen collected near Batemans Bay and the description was published in Australian Orchid Research. The specific epithet (sylvestre) is a Latin word meaning "of forests" referring to the habitat where this species grows.

Distribution and habitat
The forest leek orchid grows in tall open forest or in moist areas near wet forests. It is found in New South Wales south from near Batemans Bay and in far eastern Gippsland in Victoria.

References

External links 
 
 

sylvestre
Flora of New South Wales
Flora of Victoria (Australia)
Endemic orchids of Australia
Plants described in 1991